Lehe may refer to the following places in Germany:

Lehe, Lower Saxony, a municipality in the district of Emsland, Lower Saxony
Lehe, Schleswig-Holstein, a municipality in the district of Dithmarschen, Schleswig-Holstein
Lehe, Bremerhaven, part of the city of Bremerhaven, Bremen